Western Highlands is a province of Papua New Guinea. The provincial capital is Mount Hagen. The province covers an area of 4,299 km2, and there are 362,850 inhabitants (2011 census), making the Western Highlands the most densely populated province (apart from the National Capital District). Tea and coffee are grown in the Western Highlands.

Split to create Jiwaka Province
In July 2009, Parliament passed legislation to create two new provinces by 2012.  One of these was to be created by removing Jimi District, North Waghi District, and the South Waghi part of Anglimp-South Waghi District from the Western Highlands Province to form the new Jiwaka Province. "Jiwaka" is a portmanteau combining the first two letters each of Jimi, Waghi and Kambia.

Jiwaka Province officially came into being on 17 May 2012.

Economy
The Western Highlands economy is primarily based on coffee. Coffee is grown on plantations and small-holder blocks. They are picked, dried and processed for export. In addition, tea is also a major crop grown and processed, but in plantations by W. R. Carpenter & Co Ltd for local consumption and export. Apart from these, vegetables are grown for the domestic market, and sold mainly to markets Lae and Port Moresby.

Districts and LLGs
Since the separation of Jiwaka there are now four districts in the province. Each district has one or more Local Level Government (LLG) areas. For census purposes, the LLG areas are subdivided into wards and those into census units.

Provincial leaders

The province was governed by a decentralised provincial administration, headed by a Premier, from 1978 to 1995. Following reforms taking effect that year, the national government reassumed some powers, and the role of Premier was replaced by a position of Governor, to be held by the winner of the province-wide seat in the National Parliament of Papua New Guinea.

Premiers (1978–1995)

Governors (1995–present)

Members of the National Parliament

The province and each district is represented by a Member of the National Parliament.  There is one provincial electorate and each district is an open electorate.

References

 
Provinces of Papua New Guinea
Highlands Region